Apozyx is a genus of braconid parasitic wasps with only one species, Apozyx penyai. It is the only genus in the  subfamily Apozyginae. This subfamily was originally proposed as a separate family by Mason in 1978.

Description and distribution
The genus Apozyx, and hence the subfamily Apozyginae, are the only braconids to possess the 2m-cu cross-vein of the forewing, the presence of which otherwise serves to distinguish ichneumonids from braconids. Apozygines have a cyclostome oral cavity.

The genus has only been found in Chile.

Biology 
It is suspected that Apozyx penyai has host use patterns similar to doryctines but there have been no direct observations.

References 

Braconidae genera
Monotypic Hymenoptera genera
Endemic fauna of Chile